Alice Spence (born 30 June 1991 in Dumfries) is a Scottish curler from Lockerbie.

Career

Youth
Spence began her junior career by winning a gold medal at the 2009 European Youth Olympic Winter Festival, playing lead for the Scottish team, skipped by Anna Sloan.

Spence was the alternate on the Scottish team (skipped by Eve Muirhead) at the 2011 World Junior Curling Championships, where the team would win a gold medal, though Spence would not play in any games. Spence played second for Scotland at the 2012 World Junior Curling Championships on a team skipped by Hannah Fleming. The team would go on to win the gold medal. 

While attending Queen Margaret University, Spencer played lead for Great Britain (skipped by Fleming) at the 2013 Winter Universiade. The team finished in fourth place.

Women's
Spence played lead for Scotland at the 2014 European Mixed Curling Championship on a team skipped by Kyle Smith. They would finish fourth.

After playing one season for Lorna Vevers, Spence she returned to the Fleming rink in 2013 and has played for her ever since. She has played second on the team since 2014.  The team won the 2018 Scottish Women's Curling Championship and defeated the Eve Muirhead Olympic team for the right to represent Scotland at the 2018 Ford World Women's Curling Championship.

Personal life
Spence is employed as a lab technician.

References

External links
 

1991 births
Living people
Scottish female curlers
Sportspeople from Dumfries
People from Lockerbie
Alumni of Queen Margaret University